Siguiri is a prefecture located in the Kankan Region of Guinea. The capital is Siguiri.

Sub-prefectures
The prefecture is divided administratively into 13 sub-prefectures:
 Siguiri-Centre
 Bankon
 Doko
 Franwalia
 Kiniébakoura
 Kintinian
 Maléa
 Naboun
 Niagassola
 Niandankoro
 Norassoba
 Siguirini
 Tomba Kanssa

Prefectures of Guinea
Kankan Region